Guido Ubaldo Abbatini (1600–1656) was an Italian painter of the Baroque period, active mainly in Rome and Usigni.

Biography 
Guido Ubaldo Abbatini was a pupil of the painter Giuseppe Cesari and of Gian Lorenzo Bernini, and later worked under Pietro da Cortona. He frequently painted in fresco. He was born in Città di Castello and died in Rome. He also painted the ceiling of the Cornaro chapel of Santa Theresa in Santa Maria della Vittoria, Rome.

References

1600 births
1656 deaths
People from Città di Castello
17th-century Italian painters
Italian male painters
Italian Baroque painters
Pupils of Gian Lorenzo Bernini